Project Gemini was NASA's second human spaceflight program. Conducted between projects Mercury and Apollo, Gemini started in 1961 and concluded in 1966. The Gemini spacecraft carried a two-astronaut crew. Ten Gemini crews and 16 individual astronauts flew low Earth orbit (LEO) missions during 1965 and 1966.

Gemini's objective was the development of space travel techniques to support the Apollo mission to land astronauts on the Moon. In doing so, it allowed the United States to catch up and overcome the lead in human spaceflight capability the Soviet Union had obtained in the early years of the Space Race, by demonstrating mission endurance up to just under 14 days, longer than the eight days required for a round trip to the Moon; methods of performing extra-vehicular activity (EVA) without tiring; and the orbital maneuvers necessary to achieve rendezvous and docking with another spacecraft. This left Apollo free to pursue its prime mission without spending time developing these techniques.

All Gemini flights were launched from Launch Complex 19 (LC-19) at Cape Kennedy Air Force Station in Florida. Their launch vehicle was the Gemini–Titan II, a modified Intercontinental Ballistic Missile (ICBM). Gemini was the first program to use the newly built Mission Control Center at the Houston Manned Spacecraft Center for flight control.

The astronaut corps that supported Project Gemini included the "Mercury Seven", "The New Nine", and "The Fourteen". During the program, three astronauts died in air crashes during training, including both members of the prime crew for Gemini 9. This mission was flown by the backup crew.

Gemini was robust enough that the United States Air Force planned to use it for the Manned Orbital Laboratory (MOL) program, which was later canceled. Gemini's chief designer, Jim Chamberlin, also made detailed plans for cislunar and lunar landing missions in late 1961. He believed Gemini spacecraft could fly in lunar operations before Project Apollo, and cost less. NASA's administration did not approve those plans. In 1969, McDonnell-Douglas proposed a "Big Gemini" that could have been used to shuttle up to 12 astronauts to the planned space stations in the Apollo Applications Project (AAP). The only AAP project funded was Skylab – which used existing spacecraft and hardware – thereby eliminating the need for Big Gemini.

Pronunciation
The constellation for which the project was named is commonly pronounced , the last syllable rhyming with eye. However, staff of the Manned Spacecraft Center, including the astronauts, tended to pronounce the name , rhyming with knee. NASA's public affairs office issued a statement in 1965 declaring "Jeh-mih-nee" the "official" pronunciation. Gus Grissom, acting as Houston capsule communicator when Ed White performed his spacewalk on Gemini 4, is heard on flight recordings pronouncing the spacecraft's call sign "Jeh-mih-nee 4", and the NASA pronunciation is used in the 2018 film First Man.

Program origins and objectives
The Apollo program was conceived in early 1960 as a three-man spacecraft to follow Project Mercury. Jim Chamberlin, the head of engineering at the Space Task Group (STG), was assigned in February 1961 to start working on a bridge program between Mercury and Apollo. He presented two initial versions of a two-man spacecraft, then designated Mercury Mark II, at a NASA retreat at Wallops Island in March 1961. Scale models were shown in July 1961 at the McDonnell Aircraft Corporation's offices in St. Louis.

After Apollo was chartered to land men on the Moon by President John F. Kennedy on May 25, 1961, it became evident to NASA officials that a follow-on to the Mercury program was required to develop certain spaceflight capabilities in support of Apollo.  NASA approved the two-man / two-vehicle program rechristened Project Gemini (Latin for "twins"), in reference to the third constellation of the Zodiac with its twin stars Castor and Pollux, on December 7, 1961. McDonnell Aircraft was contracted to build it on December 22, 1961. The program was publicly announced on January 3, 1962, with these major objectives:
 To demonstrate endurance of humans and equipment in spaceflight for extended periods, at least eight days required for a Moon landing, to a maximum of two weeks
 To effect rendezvous and docking with another vehicle, and to maneuver the combined spacecraft using the propulsion system of the target vehicle
 To demonstrate Extra-Vehicular Activity (EVA), or space-"walks" outside the protection of the spacecraft, and to evaluate the astronauts' ability to perform tasks there
 To perfect techniques of atmospheric reentry and touchdown at a pre-selected location on land

Team
Chamberlin designed the Gemini capsule, which carried a crew of two. He was previously the chief aerodynamicist on Avro Canada's Avro Arrow fighter interceptor program. Chamberlin joined NASA along with 25 senior Avro engineers after cancellation of the Canadian Arrow program, and became head of the U.S. Space Task Group's engineering division in charge of Gemini. The prime contractor was McDonnell Aircraft Corporation, which was also the prime contractor for the Project Mercury capsule.

Astronaut Gus Grissom was heavily involved in the development and design of the Gemini spacecraft. What other Mercury astronauts dubbed "Gusmobile" was so designed around Grissom's 5'6" body that, when NASA discovered in 1963 that 14 of 16 astronauts would not fit in the spacecraft, the interior had to be redesigned. Grissom wrote in his posthumous 1968 book Gemini! that the realization of Project Mercury's end and the unlikelihood of his having another flight in that program prompted him to focus all his efforts on the upcoming Gemini program.

The Gemini program was managed by the Manned Spacecraft Center, located in Houston, Texas, under direction of the Office of Manned Space Flight, NASA Headquarters, Washington, D.C. Dr. George E. Mueller, Associate Administrator of NASA for Manned Space Flight, served as acting director of the Gemini program. William C. Schneider, Deputy Director of Manned Space Flight for Mission Operations served as mission director on all Gemini flights beginning with Gemini 6A.

Guenter Wendt was a McDonnell engineer who supervised launch preparations for both the Mercury and Gemini programs and would go on to do the same when the Apollo program launched crews. His team was responsible for completion of the complex pad close-out procedures just prior to spacecraft launch, and he was the last person the astronauts would see prior to closing the hatch. The astronauts appreciated his taking absolute authority over, and responsibility for, the condition of the spacecraft and developed a good-humored rapport with him.

Spacecraft

NASA selected McDonnell Aircraft, which had been the prime contractor for the Project Mercury capsule, in 1961 to build the Gemini capsule, the first of which was delivered in 1963.

The Gemini crew capsule (referred to as the Reentry Module) was essentially an enlarged version of the Mercury capsule. Unlike Mercury, the retrorockets, electrical power, propulsion systems, oxygen, and water were located in a detachable Adapter Module behind the Reentry Module. A major design improvement in Gemini was to locate all internal spacecraft systems in modular components, which could be independently tested and replaced when necessary, without removing or disturbing other already tested components.

Reentry module
Many components in the capsule itself were reachable through their own small access doors. Unlike Mercury, Gemini used completely solid-state electronics, and its modular design made it easy to repair.

Gemini's emergency launch escape system did not use an escape tower powered by a solid-fuel rocket, but instead used aircraft-style ejection seats. The tower was heavy and complicated, and NASA engineers reasoned that they could do away with it as the Titan II's hypergolic propellants would burn immediately on contact. A Titan II booster explosion had a smaller blast effect and flame than on the cryogenically fueled Atlas and Saturn. Ejection seats were sufficient to separate the astronauts from a malfunctioning launch vehicle. At higher altitudes, where the ejection seats could not be used, the astronauts would return to Earth inside the spacecraft, which would separate from the launch vehicle.

The main proponent of using ejection seats was Chamberlin, who had never liked the Mercury escape tower and wished to use a simpler alternative that would also reduce weight. He reviewed several films of Atlas and Titan II ICBM failures, which he used to estimate the approximate size of a fireball produced by an exploding launch vehicle and from this he gauged that the Titan II would produce a much smaller explosion, thus the spacecraft could get away with ejection seats.

Maxime Faget, the designer of the Mercury LES, was on the other hand less-than-enthusiastic about this setup. Aside from the possibility of the ejection seats seriously injuring the astronauts, they would also only be usable for about 40 seconds after liftoff, by which point the booster would be attaining Mach 1 speed and ejection would no longer be possible. He was also concerned about the astronauts being launched through the Titan's exhaust plume if they ejected in-flight and later added, "The best thing about Gemini was that they never had to make an escape."

The Gemini ejection system was never tested with the Gemini cabin pressurized with pure oxygen, as it was prior to launch. In January 1967, the fatal Apollo 1 fire demonstrated that pressurizing a spacecraft with pure oxygen created an extremely dangerous fire hazard. In a 1997 oral history, astronaut Thomas P. Stafford commented on the Gemini 6 launch abort in December 1965, when he and command pilot Wally Schirra nearly ejected from the spacecraft:

Gemini was the first astronaut-carrying spacecraft to include an onboard computer, the Gemini Guidance Computer, to facilitate management and control of mission maneuvers. This computer, sometimes called the Gemini Spacecraft On-Board Computer (OBC), was very similar to the Saturn Launch Vehicle Digital Computer. Its core memory had 4096 addresses, each containing a 39-bit word composed of three 13-bit "syllables". All numeric data was 26-bit two's-complement integers (sometimes used as fixed-point numbers), either stored in the first two syllables of a word or in the accumulator. Instructions (always with a 4-bit opcode and 9 bits of operand) could go in any syllable.

Unlike Mercury, Gemini used in-flight radar and an artificial horizon, similar to those used in the aviation industry. Like Mercury, Gemini used a joystick to give the astronauts manual control of yaw, pitch, and roll. Gemini added control of the spacecraft's translation (forward, backward, up, down, and sideways) with a pair of T-shaped handles (one for each crew member). Translation control enabled rendezvous and docking, and crew control of the flight path. The same controller types were also used in the Apollo spacecraft.

The original intention for Gemini was to land on solid ground instead of at sea, using a Rogallo wing rather than a parachute, with the crew seated upright controlling the forward motion of the craft. To facilitate this, the airfoil did not attach just to the nose of the craft, but to an additional attachment point for balance near the heat shield. This cord was covered by a strip of metal which ran between the twin hatches. This design was ultimately dropped, and parachutes were used to make a sea landing as in Mercury. The capsule was suspended at an angle closer to horizontal, so that a side of the heat shield contacted the water first. This eliminated the need for the landing bag cushion used in the Mercury capsule.

Adapter module
The adapter module in turn was separated into a Retro module and an Equipment module.

Retro module
The Retro module contained four solid-fuel TE-M-385 Star-13E retrorockets, each spherical in shape except for its rocket nozzle, which were structurally attached to two beams that reached across the diameter of the retro module, crossing at right angles in the center. Re-entry began with the retrorockets firing one at a time. Abort procedures at certain periods during lift-off would cause them to fire at the same time, thrusting the Descent module away from the Titan rocket.

Equipment module
Gemini was equipped with an Orbit Attitude and Maneuvering System (OAMS), containing sixteen thrusters for translation control in all three perpendicular axes (forward/backward, left/right, up/down), in addition to attitude control (pitch, yaw, and roll angle orientation) as in Mercury. Translation control allowed changing orbital inclination and altitude, necessary to perform space rendezvous with other craft, and docking with the Agena Target Vehicle (ATV), with its own rocket engine which could be used to perform greater orbit changes.

Early short-duration missions had their electrical power supplied by batteries; later endurance missions used the first fuel cells in crewed spacecraft.

Gemini was in some regards more advanced than Apollo because the latter program began almost a year earlier. It became known as a "pilot's spacecraft" due to its assortment of jet fighter-like features, in no small part due to Gus Grissom's influence over the design, and it was at this point where the US crewed space program clearly began showing its superiority over that of the Soviet Union with long duration flight, rendezvous, and extravehicular capability. The Soviet Union during this period was developing the Soyuz spacecraft intended to take cosmonauts to the Moon, but political and technical problems began to get in the way, leading to the ultimate end of their crewed lunar program.

Launch vehicle

The Titan II had debuted in 1962 as the Air Force's second-generation ICBM to replace the Atlas. By using hypergolic fuels, it could be stored longer and be easily readied for launch in addition to being a simpler design with fewer components, the only caveat being that the propellant mix (nitrogen tetroxide and hydrazine) was extremely toxic compared to the Atlas's liquid oxygen/RP-1. However, the Titan had considerable difficulty being man-rated due to early problems with pogo oscillation. The launch vehicle used a radio guidance system that was unique to launches from Cape Kennedy.

Astronauts

Deke Slayton, as director of flight crew operations, had primary responsibility for assigning crews for the Gemini program. Each flight had a primary crew and backup crew, and the backup crew would rotate to primary crew status three flights later. Slayton intended for first choice of mission commands to be given to the four remaining active astronauts of the Mercury Seven: Alan Shepard, Grissom, Cooper, and Schirra. (John Glenn had retired from NASA in January 1964 and Scott Carpenter, who was blamed by some in NASA management for the problematic reentry of Aurora 7, was on leave to participate in the Navy's SEALAB project and was grounded from flight in July 1964 due to an arm injury sustained in a motorbike accident. Slayton himself continued to be grounded due to a heart problem.)

Titles used for the left-hand (command) and right-hand seat crew positions were taken from the U.S. Air Force pilot ratings, Command Pilot and Pilot. Sixteen astronauts flew on 10 crewed Gemini missions:

Crew selection
In late 1963, Slayton selected Shepard and Stafford for Gemini 3, McDivitt and White for Gemini 4, and Schirra and Young for Gemini 5 (which was to be the first Agena rendezvous mission). The backup crew for Gemini 3 was Grissom and Borman, who were also slated for Gemini 6, to be the first long-duration mission. Finally Conrad and Lovell were assigned as the backup crew for Gemini 4.

Delays in the production of the Agena Target Vehicle caused the first rearrangement of the crew rotation. The Schirra and Young mission was bumped to Gemini 6 and they became the backup crew for Shepard and Stafford. Grissom and Borman then had their long-duration mission assigned to Gemini 5.

The second rearrangement occurred when Shepard developed Ménière's disease, an inner ear problem. Grissom was then moved to command Gemini 3. Slayton felt that Young was a better personality match with Grissom and switched Stafford and Young. Finally, Slayton tapped Cooper to command the long-duration Gemini 5. Again for reasons of compatibility, he moved Conrad from backup commander of Gemini 4 to pilot of Gemini 5, and Borman to backup command of Gemini 4. Finally he assigned Armstrong and Elliot See to be the backup crew for Gemini 5.
The third rearrangement of crew assignment occurred when Slayton felt that See wasn't up to the physical demands of EVA on Gemini 8. He reassigned See to be the prime commander of Gemini 9 and put Scott as pilot of Gemini 8 and Charles Bassett as the pilot of Gemini 9.

The fourth and final rearrangement of the Gemini crew assignment occurred after the deaths of See and Bassett when their trainer jet crashed, coincidentally into a McDonnell building which held their Gemini 9 capsule in St. Louis. The backup crew of Stafford and Cernan was then moved up to the new prime crew of Gemini 9A. Lovell and Aldrin were moved from being the backup crew of Gemini 10 to be the backup crew of Gemini 9. This cleared the way through the crew rotation for Lovell and Aldrin to become the prime crew of Gemini 12.

Along with the deaths of Grissom, White, and Roger Chaffee in the fire of Apollo 1, this final arrangement helped determine the makeup of the first seven Apollo crews, and who would be in position for a chance to be the first to walk on the Moon.

Missions

In 1964 and 1965, two Gemini missions were flown without crews to test systems and the heat shield. These were followed by 10 flights with crews in 1965 and 1966. All were launched by Titan II launch vehicles. Some highlights from the Gemini program:
 On Gemini 4, Ed White became the first American to make an extravehicular activity (EVA, or "spacewalk") on June 3, 1965.
Gemini 5 (August 21–29, 1965) demonstrated the 8-day endurance necessary for an Apollo lunar mission with the first use of fuel cells to generate its electrical power.
Gemini 6A accomplished the first space rendezvous with its sister craft Gemini 7 in December 1965, with Gemini 7 setting a 14-day endurance record for its flight.
Gemini 8 achieved the first space docking with an unmanned Agena target vehicle.
Gemini 10 established that radiation at high altitude was not a problem, further demonstrated the ability to rendezvous with a passive object, and was the first Gemini mission to fire the Agena's own rocket. Michael Collins would be the first person to meet another spacecraft in orbit, during his second successful EVA.
Gemini 11 first direct-ascent (first orbit) rendezvous with an Agena Target Vehicle, docking with it 1 hour 34 minutes after launch. This record still stands as of 2022.
On Gemini 12, Edwin "Buzz" Aldrin became the first space traveler to prove that useful work (EVA) could be done outside a spacecraft without life-threatening exhaustion, due to newly implemented footholds, handholds, and scheduled rest periods.

Rendezvous in orbit is not a straightforward maneuver. Should a spacecraft increase its speed to catch up with another, the result is that it goes into a higher and slower orbit and the distance thereby increases. The right procedure is to go to a lower orbit first and which increases relative speed, and then approach the target spacecraft from below and decrease orbital speed to meet it. To practice these maneuvers, special rendezvous and docking simulators were built for the astronauts.

Gemini-Titan launches and serial numbers

The Gemini-Titan II launch vehicle was adapted by NASA from the U.S. Air Force Titan II ICBM. (Similarly, the Mercury-Atlas launch vehicle had been adapted from the USAF Atlas missile.) The Gemini-Titan II rockets were assigned Air Force serial numbers, which were painted in four places on each Titan II (on opposite sides on each of the first and second stages). USAF crews maintained Launch Complex 19 and prepared and launched all of the Gemini-Titan II launch vehicles. Data and experience operating the Titans was of value to both the U.S. Air Force and NASA.

The USAF serial numbers assigned to the Gemini-Titan launch vehicles are given in the tables above. Fifteen Titan IIs were ordered in 1962 so the serial is "62-12XXX", but only "12XXX" is painted on the Titan II. The order for the last three of the 15 launch vehicles was canceled on July 30, 1964, and they were never built. Serial numbers were, however, assigned to them prospectively: 12568 - GLV-13; 12569 - GLV-14; and 12570 - GLV-15.

Program cost
From 1962 to 1967, Gemini cost $1.3 billion in 1967 dollars ($ in ). In January 1969, a NASA report to the US Congress estimating the costs for Mercury, Gemini, and Apollo (through the first crewed Moon landing) included $1.2834 billion for Gemini: $797.4 million for spacecraft, $409.8 million for launch vehicles, and $76.2 million for support.

Current location of hardware

Spacecraft
 Gemini 1: Intentionally disintegrated upon re-entry to the atmosphere
 Gemini 2: Air Force Space and Missile Museum, Cape Canaveral Air Force Station, Florida
 Gemini III: Grissom Memorial, Spring Mill State Park, Mitchell, Indiana
 Gemini IV: National Air and Space Museum, Washington, D.C.
 Gemini V: Johnson Space Center, NASA, Houston, Texas
 Gemini VI: Stafford Air & Space Museum, Weatherford, Oklahoma
 Gemini VII: Steven F. Udvar-Hazy Center, Chantilly, Virginia
 Gemini VIII: Armstrong Air and Space Museum, Wapakoneta, Ohio
 Gemini IX: Kennedy Space Center, NASA, Merritt Island, Florida
 Gemini X: Kansas Cosmosphere and Space Center, Hutchinson, Kansas
 Gemini XI: California Museum of Science and Industry, Los Angeles, California
 Gemini XII: Adler Planetarium, Chicago, Illinois

Trainers

 Gemini 3A: St. Louis Science Center, St. Louis, Missouri.
 Gemini MOL-B: National Museum of the United States Air Force, Wright-Patterson Air Force Base, Dayton, Ohio
 Gemini Trainer: Discovery Center, Fresno, California
 Gemini Trainer: U.S. Space & Rocket Center, Huntsville, Alabama
 Gemini Trainer: Kentucky Science Center, Louisville, Kentucky
 Gemini Trainer: Texas Air Museum, Slaton, Texas
 6165, GATV: National Air and Space Museum, Washington, D.C. (not on display)
 El Kabong: Kalamazoo Air Museum, Kalamazoo, Michigan
 Gemini Trainer: Kalamazoo Air Museum, Kalamazoo, Michigan
 TTV-2: National Space Centre, Leicester, UK
 Trainer: Pate Museum of Transportation, Fort Worth, Texas
 MSC 313: Private residence, San Jose, California
 Rogallo Test Vehicle: White Sands Space Harbor, White Sands, New Mexico
 TTV-1: Steven F. Udvar-Hazy Center, Chantilly, Virginia
 unnamed: Air Force Space and Missile Museum, Cape Canaveral Air Force Station, Florida
 unnamed: Air Force Space and Missile Museum, Cape Canaveral Air Force Station, Florida
 Ingress/Egress Trainer: U.S. Space & Rocket Center, Huntsville, Alabama
 MSC-307: USS Hornet Museum, former NAS Alameda, Alameda, California

Proposed extensions and applications

Advanced Gemini

McDonnell Aircraft, the main contractor for Mercury and Gemini, was also one of the original bidders on the prime contract for Apollo, but lost out to North American Aviation. McDonnell later sought to extend the Gemini program by proposing a derivative which could be used to fly a cislunar mission and even achieve a crewed lunar landing earlier and at less cost than Apollo, but these proposals were rejected by NASA.

A range of applications were considered for Advanced Gemini missions, including military flights, space station crew and logistics delivery, and lunar flights. The Lunar proposals ranged from reusing the docking systems developed for the Agena Target Vehicle on more powerful upper stages such as the Centaur, which could propel the spacecraft to the Moon, to complete modifications of the Gemini to enable it to land on the lunar surface. Its applications would have ranged from crewed lunar flybys before Apollo was ready, to providing emergency shelters or rescue for stranded Apollo crews, or even replacing the Apollo program.

Some of the Advanced Gemini proposals used "off-the-shelf" Gemini spacecraft, unmodified from the original program, while others featured modifications to allow the spacecraft to carry more crew, dock with space stations, visit the Moon, and perform other mission objectives. Other modifications considered included the addition of wings or a parasail to the spacecraft, in order to enable it to make a horizontal landing.

Big Gemini

Big Gemini (or "Big G") was another proposal by McDonnell Douglas made in August 1969. It was intended to provide large-capacity, all-purpose access to space, including missions that ultimately used Apollo or the Space Shuttle.

The study was performed to generate a preliminary definition of a logistic spacecraft derived from Gemini that would be used to resupply an orbiting space station. Land-landing at a preselected site and refurbishment and reuse were design requirements. Two baseline spacecraft were defined: a nine-man minimum modification version of the Gemini B called Min-Mod Big G and a 12-man advanced concept, having the same exterior geometry but with new, state-of-the-art subsystems, called Advanced Big G.  Three launch vehicles-Saturn IB, Titan IIIM, and Saturn INT-20 (S-IC/S-IVB) were investigated for use with the spacecraft.

Military applications
The Air Force had an interest in the Gemini system, and decided to use its own modification of the spacecraft as the crew vehicle for the Manned Orbital Laboratory. To this end, the Gemini 2 spacecraft was refurbished and flown again atop a mockup of the MOL, sent into space by a Titan IIIC. This was the first time a spacecraft went into space twice.

The USAF also had the notion of adapting the Gemini spacecraft for military applications, such as crude observation of the ground (no specialized reconnaissance camera could be carried) and practicing making rendezvous with suspicious satellites. This project was called Blue Gemini. The USAF did not like the fact that Gemini would have to be recovered by the US Navy, so they intended for Blue Gemini eventually to use the airfoil and land on three skids, carried over from the original design of Gemini.

At first some within NASA welcomed sharing of the cost with the USAF, but it was later agreed that NASA was better off operating Gemini by itself. Blue Gemini was canceled in 1963 by Secretary of Defense Robert McNamara, who decided the NASA Gemini flights could conduct necessary military experiments. MOL was canceled by Secretary of Defense Melvin Laird in 1969, when it was determined that uncrewed spy satellites could perform the same functions much more cost-effectively.

In media
 Two Gemini capsules (codenamed "Jupiter" instead of "Gemini") are featured in the plot of the 1967 James Bond film You Only Live Twice.
 A modified one-person Gemini capsule is used to send an astronaut (played by James Caan) to the Moon in the 1968 film Countdown.
 Gemini missions 4, 8 and 12 feature in the first episode of the HBO series From the Earth to the Moon'
Like other US space programs, Gemini was covered in the 1985 PBS series "Spaceflight"
 Some aspects of the Gemini program relating to astronaut Neil Armstrong were touched upon in the 2018 film First Man.
 Many episodes of the television show I Dream of Jeannie featured launch pad and launch footage of various Gemini missions.
 Gemini, is a layer 7 telecom standard named after the Gemini missions.  Its non-standard port number, 1965, is a reference to the first mission date.

See also

 List of crewed spacecraft
 Splashdown (spacecraft landing)
 Timeline of hydrogen technologies
 US space exploration history on US stamps

References

Notes

Citations

Books
 
 
 
 
 
 
 
 
 Shayler, David J.  Gemini'', Springer-Verlag Telos, 2001,

Articles
 
 
 
 
 
 
 Project Gemini —A Chronology (NASA report SP-4002) (PDF format)
 Gemini Midprogram Conference —Including Experiment Results (NASA report SP-121) —Manned Spacecraft Center —Houston, Texas, February 23–25, 1966
 Gemini Summary Conference (NASA report SP-138) —Manned Spacecraft Center —Houston, Texas, February 1–2, 1967

External links

 NASA Project Gemini images and videos
 NASA Project Gemini science site
 Project Gemini Drawings and Technical Diagrams
 Gemini familiarization Manuals (PDF format).
 NASA History Series Publications (many of which are on-line)
 Project Gemini McDonnell Employee Video Interviews and Archival Documents: Western Historical Manuscripts Collection in St. Louis, Missouri

 
Space program of the United States
1960s in the United States
1962 establishments in the United States
1966 disestablishments in the United States
Gemini
Human spaceflight programs
Gemini
Gemini B